Mahavira (Sanskrit: महावीर) also known as Vardhaman, Mahavirswami, was the 24th tirthankara (supreme preacher) of Jainism. He was the spiritual successor of the 23rd tirthankara Parshvanatha. Mahavira was born in the early part of the 6th century BCE into a royal Kshatriya Jain family in ancient India. His mother's name was Trishala and his father's name was Siddhartha. They were lay devotees of Parshvanatha. Mahavira abandoned all worldly possessions at the age of about 30 and left home in pursuit of spiritual awakening, becoming an ascetic. Mahavira practiced intense meditation and severe austerities for twelve and a half years, after which he attained Kevala Jnana (omniscience). He preached for 30 years and attained Moksha (liberation) in the 6th century BCE, although the year varies by sect.

Mahavira taught that observance of the vows of ahimsa (non-violence), satya (truth), asteya (non-stealing), brahmacharya (chastity), and aparigraha (non-attachment) are necessary for spiritual liberation. He taught the principles of Anekantavada (many-sided reality): syadvada and nayavada. Mahavira's teachings were compiled by Indrabhuti Gautama (his chief disciple) as the Jain Agamas. The texts, transmitted orally by Jain monks, are believed to have been largely lost by about the 1st century CE (when the remaining were first written down in the Svetambara tradition). The surviving versions of the Agamas taught by Mahavira are some of Svetambara Jainism's foundation texts, but their authenticity is disputed in Digambara Jainism.

Mahavira is usually depicted in a sitting or standing meditative posture, with the symbol of a lion beneath him. His earliest iconography is from archaeological sites in the North Indian city of Mathura, and is dated from between the 1st century BCE and the 2nd century CE. His birth is celebrated as Mahavir Janma Kalyanak and his nirvana (salvation) and also his first shishya (spiritual enlightenment) of Shri Gautama Swami is observed by Jains as Diwali.

Historically, Mahavira, who revived and preached Jainism in ancient India, was an older contemporary of Gautama Buddha. Jains celebrate Mahavir Janma Kalyanak every year on the 13th day of the Indian Calendar month of Chaitra.

Names and epithets
Surviving early Jain and Buddhist literature uses several names (or epithets) for Mahavira, including Nayaputta, Muni, Samana, Niggantha, Brahman, and Bhagavan. In early Buddhist suttas, he is referred to as Araha ("worthy") and Veyavi (derived from "Vedas", but meaning "wise". He is known as Sramana in the Kalpa Sūtra, "devoid of love and hate".

According to later Jain texts, Mahavira's childhood name was Vardhamāna ("the one who grows") because of the kingdom's prosperity at the time of his birth. According to the Kalpasutras, he was called Mahavira ("the great hero") by the gods in the Kalpa Sūtra because he remained steadfast in the midst of dangers, fears, hardships and calamities. He is also known as a tirthankara.

Historical Mahavira

It is universally accepted by scholars of Jainism that Mahavira lived in ancient India. According to the Digambara Uttarapurana text, Mahavira was born in Kundalpur in the Kingdom of the Videhas; the Śvētāmbara Kalpa Sūtra uses the name "Kundagrama", said to be located in present-day Bihar, India. Mahavira renounced his material wealth and left home when he was twenty-eight, by some accounts (thirty by others), lived an ascetic life for twelve and a half years in which he did not even sit for a time, attained Kevalgyana and then preached Jainism for thirty years. Where he preached has been a subject of disagreement between the two major traditions of Jainism: Śvētāmbara and  Digambara traditions.

It is uncertain when Mahavira was born and when he died.  One view is that Mahavira was born in 540BCE and died in 443BCE. The Barli Inscription in Prakrit language which was inscribed in 443 BCE (year 84 of the Vira Nirvana Samvat), contains the line Viraya Bhagavate chaturasiti vase, which can be interpreted as "dedicated to Lord Vira in his 84th year", 84 years after the Nirvana of the Mahavira. However, palaeographic analysis dates the inscription to the 2nd-1st century BCE. According to Buddhist and Jain texts, Buddha and Mahavira are believed to have been contemporaries which is supported by much ancient Buddhist literature. 

A firmly-established part of the Jain tradition is that the Vira Nirvana Samvat era began in 527BCE (with Mahavira's nirvana). The 12th-century Jain scholar Hemachandracharya placed Mahavira in the 6thcentury BCE. According to Jain tradition, the traditional date of 527BCE is accurate; the Buddha was younger than Mahavira and "might have attained nirvana a few years later". The place of his nirvana, Pavapuri in present-day Bihar, is a pilgrimage site for Jains.

Jain tradition

According to Jain cosmology, 24 Tirthankaras have appeared on earth; Mahavira is the last tirthankara of Avasarpiṇī (the present time cycle). A tirthankara (ford-maker, saviour or spiritual teacher) signifies the founding of a tirtha, a passage across the sea of birth-and-death cycles.

Birth

Tirthankara  Mahavira was born into a royal Kshatriya family of King Siddhartha of the Ikshvaku Dynasty and Queen Trishala of the Licchavi republic. The Ikshvaku Dynasty was founded by the First tirthankara Rishabhanatha.

According to Jains, Mahavira was born in 599BCE. His birth date falls on the thirteenth day of the rising moon in the month of Chaitra in the Vira Nirvana Samvat calendar era. It falls in March or April of the Gregorian calendar, and is celebrated by Jains as Mahavir Janma Kalyanak.

Kshatriyakund (the place of Mahavira's birth) is traditionally believed to be near Vaishali, an ancient town on the Indo-Gangetic Plain. Its location in present-day Bihar is unclear, partly because of migrations from ancient Bihar for economic and political reasons. According to the "Universal History" in Jain texts, Mahavira underwent many rebirths (total 27 births) before his 6th-century birth. They included a denizen of hell, a lion, and a god (deva) in a heavenly realm just before his last birth as the 24th tirthankara. Svetambara texts state that his embryo first formed in a Brahman woman before it was transferred by Hari-Naigamesin (the divine commander of Indra's army) to the womb of Trishala, Siddhartha's wife. The embryo-transfer legend is not believed by adherents of the Digambara tradition.

Jain texts state that after Mahavira was born, the god Indra came from the heavens along with 56 digkumaries, anointed him, and performed his abhisheka (consecration) on Mount Meru. These events, illustrated in a number of Jain temples, play a part in modern Jain temple rituals. Although the Kalpa Sūtra accounts of Mahavira's birth legends are recited by Svetambara Jains during the annual Paryushana festival, the same festival is observed by the Digambaras without the recitation.

Early life
Mahavira grew up as a prince. According to the second chapter of the Śvētāmbara Acharanga Sutra, his parents were lay devotees of Parshvanatha. Jain traditions differ about whether Mahavira married. The Digambara tradition believes that his parents wanted him to marry Yashoda, but he refused to marry. The Śvētāmbara tradition believes that he was married to Yashoda at a young age and had one daughter, Priyadarshana, also called Anojja.

Jain texts portray Mahavira as tall; his height was given as four cubits (6 feet) in the Aupapatika Sutra. According to Jain texts, he was the shortest of the twenty-four tirthankaras; earlier arihants were believed to have been taller, with Neminatha or Aristanemi —the 22nd tirthankara, who lived for 1,000 years—said to have been sixty-five cubits (98feet) in height.

Renunciation

At age thirty, Mahavira abandoned royal life and left his home and family to live an ascetic life in the pursuit of spiritual awakening. He undertook severe fasts and bodily mortifications, meditated under the Ashoka tree, and discarded his clothes. The Acharanga Sutra has a graphic description of his hardships and self-mortification. According to the Kalpa Sūtra, Mahavira spent the first forty-two monsoons of his life in Astikagrama, Champapuri, Prstichampa, Vaishali, Vanijagrama, Nalanda, Mithila, Bhadrika, Alabhika, Panitabhumi, Shravasti, and Pawapuri. He is said to have lived in Rajagriha during the rainy season of the forty-first year of his ascetic life, which is traditionally dated to 491BCE.

Omniscience

According to traditional accounts, Mahavira achieved Kevala Jnana (omniscience, or infinite knowledge) under a Sāla tree on the bank of the River Rijubalika near Jrimbhikagrama at age 43 after twelve years of rigorous penance. The details of the event are described in the Jain Uttar-purāņa and Harivamśa-purāņa texts. The Acharanga Sutra describes Mahavira as all-seeing. The Sutrakritanga expands it to all-knowing, and describes his other qualities. Jains believe that Mahavira had a most auspicious body (paramaudārika śarīra) and was free from eighteen imperfections when he attained omniscience. According to the Śvētāmbara, he traveled throughout India to teach his philosophy for thirty years after attaining omniscience. However, the Digambara believe that he remained in his Samavasarana and delivered sermons to his followers.

Disciples
Jain texts document eleven Brahmins as Mahavira's first disciples, traditionally known as the eleven Ganadharas. Indrabhuti Gautama is believed to have been their leader, and the others included Agnibhuti, Vayubhuti, Akampita, Arya Vyakta, Sudharman, Manditaputra, Mauryaputra, Acalabhraataa, Metraya, and Prabhasa. The Ganadharas are believed to have remembered and to have verbally transmitted Mahavira's teachings after his death. His teachings became known as Gani-Pidaga, or the Jain Agamas. According to Kalpa Sutra, Mahavira had 14,000 sadhus (male ascetic devotees), 36,000 sadhvis (female ascetics), 159,000 sravakas (male lay followers), and 318,000 sravikas (female lay followers). Jain tradition mentions Srenika and Kunika of Haryanka dynasty (popularly known as Bimbisara and Ajatashatru) and Chetaka of Videha as his royal followers. Mahavira initiated his mendicants with the mahavratas (Five Vows). He delivered fifty-five pravachana (recitations) and a set of lectures (Uttaraadhyayana-sutra). Chandana is believed to be the leader of female monastic order.

Nirvana and moksha

According to Jain texts, Mahavira's nirvana (death) occurred in the town of Pawapuri in present-day Bihar. His life as a spiritual light and the night of his nirvana are commemorated by Jains as Diwali at the same time that Hindus celebrate it. His chief disciple, Gautama, is said to have attained omniscience the night that Mahavira achieved nirvana from Pawapuri.

Accounts of Mahavira's nirvana vary among Jain texts, with some describing a simple nirvana and others recounting grandiose celebrations attended by gods and kings. According to the Jinasena's Mahapurana, heavenly beings arrived to perform his funeral rites. The Pravachanasara of Digambara tradition says that only the nails and hair of tirthankaras are left behind; the rest of the body dissolves in the air like camphor. In some texts Mahavira is described, at age 72, as delivering his final preaching over a six-day period to a large group of people. The crowd falls asleep, awakening to find that he has disappeared (leaving only his nails and hair, which his followers cremate).

The Jain Śvētāmbara tradition believes that Mahavira's nirvana occurred in 527 BCE, and the Digambara tradition holds that date of 468 BCE. In both traditions, his jiva (soul) is believed to abide in Siddhashila (the home of liberated souls). Mahavira's Jal Mandir stands at the place where he is said to have attained nirvana (moksha). Artworks in Jain temples and texts depict his final liberation and cremation, sometimes shown symbolically as a small pyre of sandalwood and a piece of burning camphor.

Previous births
Mahavira's previous births are recounted in Jain texts such as the Mahapurana and Tri-shashti-shalaka-purusha-charitra. Although a soul undergoes countless reincarnations in the transmigratory cycle of saṃsāra, the birth of a tirthankara is reckoned from the time he determines the causes of karma and pursues ratnatraya. Jain texts describe Mahavira's 26 births before his incarnation as a tirthankara. According to the texts, he was born as Marichi (the son of Bharata Chakravartin) in a previous life.

Texts

Yativṛṣabha's Tiloya-paṇṇatti recounts nearly all the events of Mahavira's life in a form convenient for memorisation. Jinasena's Mahapurana (which includes the Ādi purāṇa and Uttara-purāṇa) was completed by his disciple, Gunabhadra, in the 8thcentury. In the Uttara-purāṇa, Mahavira's life is described in three parvans, or sections, (74–76) and 1,818 verses.

Vardhamacharitra is a Sanskrit kāvya poem, written by Asaga in 853, which narrates the life of Mahavira.
The Kalpa Sūtra is a collection of biographies of tirthankaras, notably Parshvanatha and Mahavira. Samavayanga Sutra is a collection of Mahavira's teachings, and the Acharanga Sutra recounts his asceticism.

Teachings

Colonial-era Indologists considered Jainism (and Mahavira's followers) a sect of Buddhism because of superficial similarities in iconography and meditative and ascetic practices. As scholarship progressed, differences between the teachings of Mahavira and the Buddha were found so divergent that the religions were acknowledged as separate. Mahavira, says Moriz Winternitz, taught a "very elaborate belief in the soul" (unlike the Buddhists, who denied such elaboration). His ascetic teachings have a higher order of magnitude than those of Buddhism or Hinduism, and his emphasis on ahimsa (non-violence) is greater than that in other Indian religions.

Agamas

Mahavira's teachings were compiled by Gautama Swami, his Ganadhara (chief disciple). The canonical scriptures are in twelve parts. Mahavira's teachings were gradually lost after about 300BCE, according to Jain tradition, when a severe famine in the Magadha kingdom dispersed the Jain monks. Attempts were made by later monks to gather, recite the canon, and re-establish it. These efforts identified differences in recitations of Mahavira's teachings, and an attempt was made in the 5thcentury CE to reconcile the differences. The reconciliation efforts failed, with Svetambara and Digambara Jain traditions holding their own incomplete, somewhat-different versions of Mahavira's teachings. In the early centuries of the common era, Jain texts containing Mahavira's teachings were written in palm-leaf manuscripts. According to the Digambaras, Āchārya Bhutabali was the last ascetic with partial knowledge of the original canon. Later, some learned achāryas restored, compiled, and wrote down the teachings of Mahavira which were the subjects of the Agamas. Āchārya Dharasena, in the 1stcentury CE, guided the Āchāryas Pushpadant and Bhutabali as they wrote down the teachings. The two Āchāryas wrote Ṣaṭkhaṅḍāgama, among the oldest-known Digambara texts, on palm leaves.

Five Vows

The Jain Agamas enumerate five vratas (vows) which ascetics and householders must observe. These ethical principles were preached by Mahavira:
 Ahimsa (Non-violence or non-injury): Mahavira taught that every living being has sanctity and dignity which should be respected as one expects one's own sanctity and dignity to be respected. Ahimsa, Jainism's first and most important vow, applies to actions, speech, and thought.
 Satya (truthfulness): Applies to oneself and others.
 Asteya (non-stealing): Not "taking anything that has not been given"
 Brahmacharya (chastity): Abstinence from sex and sensual pleasures for monks, and faithfulness to one's partner for householders
 Aparigraha (non-attachment): For lay people, an attitude of non-attachment to property or worldly possessions; for mendicants, not owning anything

The goal of these principles is to achieve spiritual peace, a better rebirth, or (ultimately) liberation. According to Chakravarthi, these teachings help improve a person's quality of life. However, Dundas writes that Mahavira's emphasis on non-violence and restraint has been interpreted by some Jain scholars to "not be driven by merit from giving or compassion to other creatures, nor a duty to rescue all creatures" but by "continual self discipline": a cleansing of the soul which leads to spiritual development and release.

Mahavira is best remembered in the Indian traditions for his teaching that ahimsa is the supreme moral virtue. He taught that ahimsa covers all living beings, and injuring any being in any form creates bad karma (which affects one's rebirth, future well-being, and suffering). According to Mahatma Gandhi, Mahavira was the greatest authority on ahimsa.

Soul

Mahavira taught that the soul exists, a premise shared with Hinduism but not Buddhism. There is no soul (or self) in Buddhism, and its teachings are based on the concept of anatta (non-self). Mahavira taught that the soul is dravya (substantial), eternal, and yet temporary.

To Mahavira, the metaphysical nature of the universe consists of dravya, jiva, and ajiva (inanimate objects). The jiva is bound to saṃsāra (transmigration) because of karma (the effects of one's actions). Karma, in Jainism, includes actions and intent; it colors the soul (lesya), affecting how, where, and as what a soul is reborn after death.

According to Mahavira, there is no creator deity and existence has neither beginning nor end. Gods and demons exist in Jainism, however, whose jivas a part of the same cycle of birth and death. The goal of spiritual practice is to liberate the jiva from its karmic accumulation and enter the realm of the siddhas, souls who are liberated from rebirth. Enlightenment, to Mahavira, is the consequence of self-cultivation and self-restraint.

Anekantavada

Mahavira taught the doctrine of anekantavada (many-sided reality). Although the word does not appear in the earliest Jain literature or the Agamas, the doctrine is illustrated in Mahavira's answers to questions posed by his followers. Truth and reality are complex, and have a number of aspects. Reality can be experienced, but it is impossible to express it fully with language alone; human attempts to communicate are nayas ("partial expression[s] of the truth"). Language itself is not truth, but a means of expressing it. From truth, according to Mahavira, language returns—not the other way around. One can experience the "truth" of a taste, but cannot fully express that taste through language. Any attempt to express the experience is syāt: valid "in some respect", but still a "perhaps, just one perspective, incomplete". Spiritual truths are also complex, with multiple aspects, and language cannot express their plurality; however, they can be experienced through effort and appropriate karma.

Mahavira's anekantavada doctrine is also summarized in Buddhist texts such as the Samaññaphala Sutta (in which he is called Nigantha Nātaputta), and is a key difference between the teachings of Mahavira and those of the Buddha. The Buddha taught the Middle Way, rejecting the extremes of "it is" or "it is not"; Mahavira accepted both "it is" and "it is not", with reconciliation and the qualification of "perhaps".

The Jain Agamas suggest that Mahavira's approach to answering metaphysical, philosophical questions was a "qualified yes" (syāt). A version of this doctrine is also found in the Ajivika school of ancient Indian philosophy.

According to Dundas, the anekantavada doctrine has been interpreted by many Jains as "promot[ing] a universal religious tolerance ... plurality ... [and a] ... benign attitude to other [ethical, religious] positions"; however, this misreads Jain historical texts and Mahavira's teachings. Mahavira's "many pointedness, multiple perspective" teachings are a doctrine about the nature of reality and human existence, not about tolerating religious positions such as sacrificing animals (or killing them for food) or violence against nonbelievers (or any other living being) as "perhaps right". The five vows for Jain monks and nuns are strict requirements, with no "perhaps". Mahavira's Jainism co-existed with Buddhism and Hinduism beyond the renunciant Jain communities, but each religion was "highly critical of the knowledge systems and ideologies of their rivals".

Gender
A historically contentious view in Jainism is partially attributed to Mahavira and his ascetic life; he did not wear clothing, as a sign of renunciation (the fifth vow, aparigraha). It was disputed whether a female mendicant (sadhvi) could achieve the spiritual liberation of a male mendicant (sadhu) through asceticism.

The digambar sect (the sky-clad, naked mendicant order) believed that a woman is unable to fully practice asceticism and cannot achieve spiritual liberation because of her gender; she can, at best, live an ethical life so she is reborn as a man. According to this view, women are seen as a threat to a monk's chastity.

Mahavira had preached about men and women equality. The Svetambaras have interpreted Mahavira's teaching as encouraging both sexes to pursue a mendicant, ascetic life with the possibility of moksha (kaivalya, spiritual liberation).

Rebirth and realms of existence

Rebirth and realms of existence are fundamental teachings of Mahavira. According to the Acaranga Sutra, Mahavira believed that life existed in myriad forms which included animals, plants, insects, bodies of water, fire, and wind. He taught that a monk should avoid touching or disturbing any of them (including plants) and never swim, light (or extinguish) a fire, or wave their arms in the air; such actions might injure other beings living in those states of matter.

Mahavira preached that the nature of existence is cyclic, and the soul is reborn after death in one of the trilokthe heavenly, hellish, or earthly realms of existence and suffering. Humans are reborn, depending on one's karma (actions) as a human, animal, element, microbe, or other form, on earth or in a heavenly (or hellish) realm. Nothing is permanent; everyone (including gods, demons and earthly beings) dies and is reborn, based on their actions in their previous life. Jinas who have reached Kevala Jnana (omniscience) are not reborn; they enter the siddhaloka, the "realm of the perfected ones".

Legacy

Lineage 
Mahavira is erroneously called the founder of Jainism, but Jains believe that the 23 previous tirthankaras also espoused it. Mahavira is placed in Parshvanatha's lineage as his spiritual successor and ultimate leader of shraman sangha.

Parshvanatha was born 273 years before Mahavira. Parshvanatha, a tirthankara whom modern Western historians consider a historical figure, lived in about the 8th century BCE. Jain texts suggest that Mahavira's parents were lay devotees of Parshvanatha. When Mahavira revived the Jain community in the 6th century BCE, ahimsa was already an established, strictly observed rule. The followers of Parshvanatha vowed to observe ahimsa; this obligation was part of their caujjama dhamma (Fourfold Restraint).

According to Dundas, Jains believe that the lineage of Parshvanatha influenced Mahavira. Parshvanatha, as the one who "removes obstacles and has the capacity to save", is a popular icon; his image is the focus of Jain temple devotion. Of the 24 tirthankaras, Jain iconography has celebrated Mahavira and Parshvanatha the most; sculptures discovered at the Mathura archaeological site have been dated to the 1stcentury BCE. According to Moriz Winternitz, Mahavira may be considered a reformer of an existing Jain sect known as Niganthas (fetter-less) which was mentioned in early Buddhist texts. The Barli Inscription dating back to 443 BCE contains the line Viraya Bhagavate chaturasiti vase, which can be interpreted as "dedicated to Lord Vira in his 84th year".

Festivals
Two major annual Jain festivals associated with Mahavira are Mahavir Janma Kalyanak and Diwali. During Mahavir Janma Kalyanak, Jains celebrate Mahavira's birth as the 24th and last tirthankara of avasarpiṇī (the current time cycle). During Mahavir JanmaKalyanak, the five auspicious events of Mahavira's life are re-enacted. Diwali commemorates the anniversary of Mahavira's nirvana, and is celebrated at the same time as the Hindu festival. Diwali marks the New Year for Jains.

Worship

Samantabhadra's Svayambhustotra praises the twenty-four tirthankaras, and its eight shlokas (songs) adore Mahavira. One such shloka reads: Samantabhadra's Yuktyanusasana is a 64-verse poem which also praises Mahavira.

Influence
Mahavira's teachings were influential. According to Rabindranath Tagore,

An event associated with the 2,500th anniversary of Mahavira's nirvana was held in 1974:

Iconography 

Mahavira is usually depicted in a sitting (or standing) meditative pose, with a lion symbol beneath him; each tīrthankara has a distinct emblem, which allows worshippers to distinguish similar idols. Mahavira's lion emblem is usually carved below his legs. Like all tirthankaras, he is depicted with a Shrivatsa in Shetamber tradition. The yoga pose is very common in Buddhism, Hinduism, and Jainism. Each tradition has had a distinctive auspicious chest mark that allows devotees to identify a meditating statue to symbolic icon for their theology. There are several srivasta found in ancient and medieval Jain art works, and these are not found on Buddhist or Hindu art works. and downcast eyes in digamber tradition while in Shetamber tradition it is wide open.

Mahavira's earliest iconography is from archaeological sites in the north Indian city of Mathura, dated from the 1stcentury BCE to the 2ndcentury CE. The srivatsa mark on his chest and his dhyana-mudra posture appears in Kushana Empire-era artwork. Differences in Mahavira's depiction between the Digambara and Svetambara traditions appear in the late 5thcentury CE. According to John Cort, the earliest archaeological evidence of Jina iconography with inscriptions precedes its datable texts by over 250 years.

Many images of Mahavira have been dated to the 12th century and earlier; an ancient sculpture was found in a cave in Sundarajapuram, Theni district, Tamil Nadu. K. Ajithadoss, a Jain scholar in Chennai, dated it to the 9th century.

Jivantasvami represents Mahavira as a princely state. The Jina is represented as standing in the kayotsarga pose wearing crown and ornaments.

Temples

Along with Rishabhanath, Parshvanath, Neminath, and Shantinath; Mahavira is one of the five tirthankaras that attract the most devotional worship among the Jains. Various Jain temple complexes across India feature him, and these are important pilgrimage sites in Jainism. Pawapuri, for example, is a hilly part of southern Bihar, which is believed to have been a place where 23 out of 24 tirthankaras preached, along with Rishabha. According to John Cort, the Mahavira temple in Osian, Jodhpur, Rajasthan is the oldest surviving Jain temple in western India; it was built in the late 8thcentury. Important Mahavira temple complexes include Jal Mandir in Pawapuri, Trilokyanatha Temple, Meguti Jain Temple, Kumbharia Mahavira Temple, Sankighatta, Muchhal Mahavir Temple, Bhandavapur Jain Tirth, Dimapur Jain Temple, and Jain temple, Kundalpur

See also

 Jivantasvami
 Arihant (Jainism)
 God in Jainism
 History of Jainism
 Mahavira: The Hero of Nonviolence
 Timeline of Jainism
 Bardhaman (city named after Mahaviraswami)

Notes

References

Citations

Sources

External links

 
Ascetics
Indian Jain religious leaders
Nonviolence advocates
Tirthankaras
Solar dynasty
Indian Jain monks
6th-century BC religious leaders
5th-century BC religious leaders
6th-century BC Indian Jains
6th-century BC Jain monks
6th-century BC Indian monks
6th-century BC Indian philosophers
5th-century BC Indian Jains
5th-century BC Jain monks
5th-century BC Indian monks
5th-century BC Indian philosophers
People from Bihar
Ancient Indian philosophers
6th-century BC Indian people